Grodzisk County may refer to two counties (powiats) in Poland; in Polish they are both named powiat grodziski (which means powiat of Grodzisk):

Grodzisk Mazowiecki County, with county seat in Grodzisk Mazowiecki
Grodzisk Wielkopolski County, with county seat in Grodzisk Wielkopolski